Marcus Perperna, Roman consul in 130 BC, is said to have been a consul before he was a citizen; for Valerius Maximus relates, that the father of this Perperna was condemned under the lex Papia after the death of his son, because he had falsely usurped the rights of a Roman citizen but his father was later deemed innocent of all charges and his citizenship was reinstated because he was one of the few clever enough to keep his family records because they took advantage of a law of colonists reclaiming Roman citizenship if they can prove it.

Career
M. Perperna was praetor in 135 BC, in which year he had the conduct of the First Servile War in Sicily, and in consequence of the advantages which he obtained over them received the honour of an ovation on his return to Rome. He was consul in 130 BC with Lucius Cornelius Lentulus (and consul suffectus Appius Claudius Pulcher), and was sent into Anatolia against Aristonicus, who had defeated one of the consuls of the previous year, Publius Licinius Crassus Dives Mucianus. Perperna, however, soon brought the war to a close. He defeated Aristonicus in the first engagement, and followed up his victory by laying siege to Stratonikeia, whither Aristonicus had fled. The town was compelled by famine to surrender, and the king accordingly fell into the consul's hands. Perperna did not, however, live to enjoy the triumph, which he would undoubtedly have obtained, but died in the neighbourhood of Pergamum on his return to Rome in 129 BC. Perperna also granted the right of asylum to the temple of Diana in the town of Hierocaesareia in Lydia.

References
 Smith, William (editor); Dictionary of Greek and Roman Biography and Mythology, "M. Perperna (2)", Boston, (1867)

Notes

Year of birth unknown
129 BC deaths
2nd-century BC Roman consuls
2nd-century BC Roman generals
2nd-century BC Roman praetors
Marcus consul 624 AUC